Anacampsis okui is a moth of the family Gelechiidae. It was described by Kyu-Tek Park in 1988. It is found in Japan and Russia.

References

Moths described in 1988
Anacampsis
Moths of Japan
Moths of Asia